"I Can't Let Maggie Go" is a song by the British pop group Honeybus from early 1968. Written by band member Pete Dello, it was released as a non-album single.

The song became an international Top 20 hit, reaching number 13 in New Zealand and number 11 in Ireland. It did best in their native United Kingdom, where it reached number eight in the UK Singles Chart.

Chart history

Weekly charts

Year-end charts

Later uses
"I Can't Let Maggie Go" was included on the group's later compilation LPs, Honeybus at Their Best and Old Masters Hidden Treasures.

Cover versions
The song was also a top 10 hit in Italy, with a 1968 version made by Equipe 84, entitled "Un angelo blu" ("A blue angel"). and by The Shinings. It enjoyed an unexpected return in popularity in the 1970s, when it was used as a TV commercial jingle for "Nimble", a bread produced for slimmers.

A 1969 cover by The Birds reached number 4 in Perth, Australia.

"I Can't Let Maggie Go" has been covered by J. Vincent Edwards in 1974, as well as by the Sideburns in 1993. David Essex included his own version on the 2005 compilation album, The Complete Collection.

Singer and record producer Jonathan King released a version of the song in 1991. It was released as a tribute to outgoing prime minister Margaret Thatcher.

A faithful adaptation of the song was released in 1969 under the name "No Puedes, Maggie" by Los Condes; a band from the  Balearic Islands, Spain.

References

External links
 Lyrics of this song
 

1968 songs
1968 singles
Decca Records singles